Ulric is an English language, masculine given name. It is regarded as both a derivative of the Old English male name Wulfric and, in later English language contexts, also derived from the separate name Ulrich, which originated in Germany. Ulric may refer to:

People with the name
See Ulrich for a list of historical individuals whose name may be anglicized as Ulric.

Modern era
Jean Auguste Ulric Scheler (1819–1890), Belgian philologist born in Switzerland
John Ulric Nef (chemist) (1899–1988), a Swiss-born American chemist 
Lenore Ulric (d. 1970), a star of the Broadway stage and Hollywood silent films
Philip Ulric Strengberg (1805–1872), a businessman in Jakobstad
Ulric Browne, a UK-based actor who plays Winston in EastEnders
Ulric Cross (1917–2013), Trinidadian jurist, diplomat and Royal Air Force navigator,
Ulric Dahlgren (1842–1864), Union Army Colonel
Ulric Ellerhusen (1879–1957), a German-American sculptor and teacher
Ulric Guttinguer (born 1866), a French novelist
Ulric Haynes (born 1931), a former United States Ambassador to Algeria
Ulric Neisser (born 1928), an American psychologist
Ulric Nisbet (1897–1987), a British writer
Ulric-Joseph Tessier (1817–1892), a Quebec lawyer, judge, seigneur and political figure

Fictional characters
Nyx Ulric, the main protagonist in Kingsglaive: Final Fantasy XV
Hero of Lucis, member of Kingsglaive ordained by King Regis Lucis.

See also
 Ulrica
 Ulrich
 Ullrich
 Ulrik

Notes 

Masculine given names